"A City upon a Hill" is a phrase derived from the teaching of salt and light in Jesus's Sermon on the Mount.  Its use in political rhetoric used in United States politics is as a declaration of American exceptionalism to refer to America acting as a "beacon of hope" for the world.

"A Model of Christian Charity"
This scripture was cited at the end of Puritan John Winthrop's lecture or treatise, "A Model of Christian Charity" delivered on March 21, 1630, at Holyrood Church in Southampton before his first group of Massachusetts Bay colonists embarked on the ship Arbella to settle Boston. In quoting Matthew's Gospel (5:14) in which Jesus warns, "a city on a hill cannot be hid," Winthrop warned his fellow Puritans that their new community would be "as a city upon a hill, the eyes of all people are upon us", meaning, if the Puritans failed to uphold their covenant with God, then their sins and errors would be exposed for all the world to see: "So that if we shall deal falsely with our God in this work we have undertaken and so cause him to withdraw his present help from us, we shall be made a story and a byword through the world".

Winthrop's lecture was forgotten for nearly two hundred years until the Massachusetts Historical Society published it in 1838. It remained an obscure reference for more than another century until Cold War era historians and political leaders reinterpreted the event, crediting Winthrop's text, erroneously, as the foundational document of the idea of American exceptionalism. More recently, Princeton historian Dan T. Rogers has corrected the record, explaining that there was no grand sense of destiny among the first Puritans to settle Boston. They carried no ambitions to build a New Jerusalem. They did not name their new home Zion, or Canaan, the promised land of milk and honey. They sought only a place to uphold their covenant with God, free from the interference they experienced in England. By the second generation of settlement, New England was a backwater in the Protestant Reformation, an inconsequential afterthought to the Puritan Commonwealth in England and the wealthier Dutch Republic. In truth, America's sense of destiny came generations later.<ref>Daniel T. Rodgers, As a City on a Hill: The Story of America's Most Famous Lay Sermon, Princeton University Press, 2018; Richard M. Gamble, In Search of the City on a Hill: The Making and Unmaking of an American Myth, Continuum, 2012; and Carter Wilkie, How modern leaders got John Winthrop’s ‘City on a Hill’ wrong:  A call for humility has become the battle cry for American exceptionalism, CommonWealth Magazine, January 17, 2019.</ref>

Winthrop's warning that "we will become a story" has been fulfilled several times in the four centuries since, as described in Wayward Puritans: A Study in the Sociology of Deviance by Kai T. Erikson in 1966.

Use in political rhetoric
On 9 January 1961, President-elect John F. Kennedy quoted the phrase during an address delivered to the General Court of Massachusetts:

On November 3, 1980, Ronald Reagan referred to the same event and image in his Election Eve Address "A Vision for America".  Reagan was reported to have been inspired by author Manly P. Hall and his book The Secret Destiny of America, which alleged a secret order of philosophers had created the idea of America as a country for religious freedom and self-governance.

Reagan would reference this concept through multiple speeches; notably again in his January 11, 1989, farewell speech to the nation:

U.S. Senator Barack Obama also made reference to the topic in his commencement address on June 2, 2006, at the University of Massachusetts Boston:

In 2016, 2012 Republican presidential candidate Mitt Romney incorporated the idiom into a condemnation of Donald Trump's 2016 presidential campaign:

During the 2016 presidential race, Texas Senator Ted Cruz used the phrase during his speech announcing the suspension of his campaign. President Barack Obama also alluded to President Ronald Reagan's use of the phrase during his speech at the Democratic National Convention the same year, as he proposed a vision of America in contrast to that of Republican presidential candidate Donald Trump.

In 2017, former FBI Director James Comey used the phrase in testimony before the Senate Intelligence Committee on the investigation into Russian interference in the 2016 U.S. presidential election:

On November 10, 2020, Secretary of State Mike Pompeo used the phrase while delivering an address at the inauguration of the Ronald Reagan Institute Center for Freedom and Democracy.
Senator Amy Klobuchar used the phrase during opening remarks at the presidential inauguration of Joe Biden.

Chair Bennie Thompson of the United States House Select Committee on the January 6 Attack used the phrase in his opening remarks to the first day of hearing on June 9.

Use in Australian politics
In Australian politics, the similar phrase "the light on the hill" was famously used in a 1949 conference speech by Prime Minister Ben Chifley, and as a consequence this phrase is used to describe the objective of the Australian Labor Party. It has often been referenced by both journalists and political leaders in that context since this time.

 Use in Augustine and Roman Catholic politics 

Use in hymns
The phrase is used in the hymn "Now, Saviour now, Thy love impart". written by Charles Wesley.

See also

 American civil religion
 American exceptionalism
 Christian Dominionism
 Empire of Liberty
 Manifest destiny
 New Jerusalem
 Replacement Theology
 Safed in Israel, considered by some to have been the city Jesus had in mind
 Speeches and debates of Ronald Reagan

References

Notes

Further reading
 
 Gamble, Richard M. (2012).  In Search of the City on a Hill: The Making and Unmaking of an American Myth'' Continuum. ISBN 978-1441162328. 
 
 
Abram Van Engen (2020). City on a Hill: A History of American Exceptionalism. Yale University Press. 
Matthew Rowley (2021). "Reverse-Engineering the Covenant: Moses, Massachusetts Bay and the Construction of a City on a Hill". Journal of the Bible and its Reception, 8, no. 2.

17th-century neologisms
1989 speeches
English phrases
New Testament words and phrases
Christian terminology
American political philosophy
Speeches by Ronald Reagan
American exceptionalism
Matthew 5
1980 speeches
1989 in American politics
1980 United States presidential election
Sermon on the Mount